SPVA may refer to:

 Service Personnel and Veterans Agency, an executive agency of the UK Ministry of Defence
 Singapore Phonogram Videogram Association, former name of Recording Industry Association Singapore
 S-PVA, super patterned vertical alignment, a type of thin-film-transistor liquid-crystal display
 Secure POS Vendor Alliance, a nonprofit organization